São Domingos is a municipality located in the Brazilian state of Sergipe. Its population was 11,207 (2020) and its area is 102 km².

References

Municipalities in Sergipe